

"Ice Lake-SP" (10 nm) Scalable Performance 

 Support for up to 16 DIMMs of DDR4 memory per CPU socket, maximum 4 TB.
 Supports up to two sockets
 PCI Express 4.0 lanes: 64
 -M: Media processing specialized
 -N: Network & NFV specialized
 -P: IaaS cloud specialized
 -Q: Liquid cooled
 -S: 512 GB SGX enclave per CPU
 -T: High thermal-case and extended reliability
 -U: Uniprocessor
 -V: SaaS cloud specialized
 -Y: Supports Intel  2.0

Xeon Gold (uniprocessor)

Xeon Silver (dual processor)

Xeon Gold (dual processor)

Xeon Platinum (dual processor)

"Ice Lake-W" (10 nm)

Xeon W-33xx (uniprocessor) 
 PCI Express lanes: 64
 Supports up to 16 DIMMs of DDR4 memory, maximum 4 TB.

References 

Intel Xeon (Ice Lake)
Intel x86 microprocessors